"Baby Face" is a popular Tin Pan Alley jazz song. The music was written by Harry Akst, with lyrics by Benny Davis, and the song was published in 1926.

The first recording of it was by Jan Garber and his Orchestra, featuring lyricist Benny Davis singing the chorus only. The record was a number one hit in 1926.

The first full version of the song sung on record was released later that same year by Whispering Jack Smith, backed on piano by Arthur Johnston. Smith sang in a half-talking style and started the first verse with "baby cheeks" instead of the familiar "rosy cheeks." He started the second verse with "When you were just a baby, and that's not so long ago."

Recordings
"Baby Face" was performed and recorded by many recording artists of the time, including Al Jolson. It has remained a commonly performed song.

An instrumental version of the song was used in the 1933 film Baby Face starring Barbara Stanwyck.

In 1958, Little Richard peaked at No. 12 on the R&B chart and No. 41 on the pop chart with his version of the song. It also reached No. 2 in the UK in January 1959, becoming Little Richard's highest charting single in the United Kingdom.

In 1962, American singer Bobby Darin recorded a version as a single.

In 1967, a refrain was mixed with the Hallelujah chorus in Thoroughly Modern Millie.

In 1974, in the Paul McCartney and Wings special One Hand Clapping,  McCartney performed the song at a piano. He later sang the song on his 2007 Secret Tour.

In late 1975, disco studio group Wing and a Prayer Fife and Drum Corps recorded a version of the song where it peaked at number two for two weeks on the disco chart. This version also went to No. 32 on the soul chart, No. 6 Easy Listening and No. 14 on the Hot 100 during the winter of 1976. In the UK Singles Chart, it peaked at No. 12, in February 1976, spending 7 weeks within the Top 50.

On December 31, 1976, bandleader Guy Lombardo and the Royal Canadians kicked off their New Year's Eve concert (a tradition since 1929), with an instrumental performance of the song on CBS television. The concert was Lombardo's last before his death on November 5, 1977. The Royal Canadians New Year's specials would end on the network in 1978.

Swan Districts, an Australian Rules club in the WAFL since 1934, bases its club song on this tune.

A version done by the Muppet Chickens appears on The Muppet Show 2 album. The first singing of it was done with a simple beat in the background, then the rest of the song is sung with more rock-oriented background music.

Other major recordings of the song have been (listed alphabetically) by:

In popular culture
In 1976, the Brady family performed the song for the opening number for the pilot episode of The Brady Bunch Variety Hour.

Then 85 year old Mae West performed a rendition in the 1978 film Sextette.

A parody, retitled "Baby Pants", was used in a Luvs diapers TV commercial in the 1980s.

References

External links

"Baby Face" is also a song by Nigerian singer Wande Coal. It was released on November 5, 2013 and a few days after it was released, Wande Coal got departed from Mavin Records.

1926 songs
1926 singles
1958 singles
1976 singles
1983 singles
Little Richard songs
Whispering Jack Smith songs
Disco songs
Songs with music by Harry Akst
Songs written by Benny Davis
Eddie Cantor songs
Julie Andrews songs